Alain Caron (born May 5, 1955) is a Canadian jazz bassist.

The youngest of 11 children, Caron started playing bass at age 11 and began pursuing jazz at age 15. His musical skills were formalised by correspondence lessons with the jazz improvisation teacher Charlie Banacos and by attending a summer session at Berklee College of Music.

Caron is a founding member of the jazz fusion band UZEB. In 1993, Caron began releasing albums as Le Band. He has also recorded with Leni Stern and with Gino Vannelli.

Discography
Caron - Ecay - Lockwood (1992)
Le Band (1993)
Rhythm 'n Jazz (1995)
Play (1997)
Call Me Al (2000)
5 (2003)
Conversations (2007)
Sep7entrion (2010)
Multiple Faces (2013)

Books
Rhythm 'n Jazz – Ultimate Play-Along for Bass: Jam With Alain Caron and His Band Le Band (1998)   
Play – Ultimate Play-Along for Bass: Jam With Alain Caron and His Band Le Band (1999)

Instrument
Luthier George Furlanetto of F Bass in Hamilton, Ontario, has built basses for Caron since the eighties. Furlanetto worked with Caron to develop the F Bass Alain Caron model (AC6), which has the tone of a solid body fretless with the dynamic characteristics of an acoustic guitar.

Awards and distinctions
Félix Awards for both "Group of the Year" and "Jazz Album of the Year".
With Uzeb, the Oscar Peterson Lifetime Achievement Award, presented at the 1991 Montreal International Jazz Festival.
On August 30, 2007, the University of Quebec at Rimouski (UQAR), presented an honorary doctorate to Caron.
 Member of the Order of Canada.

References

External links
 Alain Caron interview with Anil Prasad of Innerviews

1955 births
20th-century Canadian bass guitarists
21st-century Canadian bass guitarists
Canadian jazz bass guitarists
Canadian jazz composers
Félix Award winners
Jazz fusion musicians
Living people
Male jazz composers
Musicians from Quebec
People from Bas-Saint-Laurent
Male bass guitarists
20th-century Canadian male musicians
21st-century Canadian male musicians
Canadian film score composers